Joseph William Owen (born 13 September 1956) is a British former motorcycle speedway rider.

Born in Ormskirk, Owen took up speedway at the age of fourteen at the training school at Belle Vue and made his competitive debut for Barrow Bombers in the British League second division in 1973. By 1974 he averaged over seven points per match and rode in the Young England team in matches against Australasia and Poland. In 1975 he moved to Newcastle Diamonds and rode in the top division for Hull Vikings, for which he would go on to ride until 1981. He again represented Young England in 1975 and finished as runner-up in the British Junior Championship. He went on to represent the full England team on several occasions. Owen won the National League Riders Final in both 1976 and 1982 and finished as runner-up in the European Under-21 Championship in 1977. He returned to Newcastle in the National League in 1982, also riding on loan at Leicester Lions in the British League in 1982 and 1983. In 1985 he moved on to Ellesmere Port Gunners in what proved to be his final season, in which the Gunners won the National League and Owen won the National League Best Pairs title with Louis Carr. A crash at Birmingham in 1985 ended his career and left him paralysed.

References

1956 births
Living people
British speedway riders
English motorcycle racers
People from Ormskirk
Newcastle Diamonds riders
Hull Vikings riders
Leicester Lions riders
Ellesmere Port Gunners riders
Belle Vue Aces riders
Cradley Heathens riders